Anzi is a town and comune   in the province of Potenza, in the Southern Italian region of Basilicata.

Main sights

Anzi boasts the fourth largest static nativity scene in Europe. Since 2008, an astronomical observatory and planetarium has been in service on the summit of Mount Siri, managed by the Teerum Valgemon Aesai voluntary association, based in Anzi. By contacting the association, it is possible to visit the nativity scene and join in the exhibitions at the planetarium, as well as to participate in evenings of celestial observation.

People 
 Anthony Celebrezze, United States Secretary of Health, Education and Welfare from 1962 to 1965.
 Giuseppe Di Melfi, alias 'Young Zulu Kid', American flyweight boxer (1897–1977).

Geography  
It is the fourth highest comune in the region by altitude, after Pietrapertosa, Marsicovetere and Viggiano.

It is bounded by the comuni of Abriola (17 km), Brindisi Montagna (19 km), Calvello (15 km), Castelmezzano (21 km), Laurenzana (11 km), Pignola (23 km), Potenza (25 km), Trivigno (16 km).

Twin towns
 Ripacandida, Italy

References

External links

Cities and towns in Basilicata